Sir John Parnell, 2nd Baronet (25 December 1744 – December 1801) was an Anglo-Irish Member of Parliament.

Biography
A Church of Ireland landowner, his family had originally migrated to Ireland from Congleton in Cheshire. Although not from a Roman Catholic Irish background, Parnell is renowned in Irish history for his efforts to bring about a more emancipated country and was the great-grandfather of Charles Stewart Parnell, leader of the Irish Home Rule campaign.

Parnell first served in the Parliament of Ireland as one of the members for Bangor, from 1767 to 1768. He later sat for Queen's County from 1783 until the Union with Great Britain created the United Kingdom of Great Britain and Ireland in 1801. After the Union, he gained a seat in the Parliament of the United Kingdom for a short time as member for Queen's County, but died in December of the same year.

From a line of politically astute ancestors who had moved to Ireland in the 17th century, Parnell rose to the highest positions in Irish politics as Commissioner of the Revenue (1780), Chancellor of the Exchequer of Ireland (1787), and Lord of the Treasury (1793).

He died suddenly in London in 1801.

Opposers

The only son of Sir John Parnell, 1st Baronet and Anne Ward, daughter of Michael Ward, justice of the  Court of King's Bench (Ireland), Parnell was the great-grandfather of Charles Stewart Parnell, known as the uncrowned king of Ireland and was best known for opposing (with his son Henry)  the Act of Union between the two kingdoms of Great Britain and Ireland in 1801. Before this, Parnell was a Commander of Irish Volunteers and had been instrumental in winning the right for Irish Roman Catholics to vote and to be elected to Parliament. However, the latter faltered when the parliament of Ireland was dissolved in 1800.

Henry Grattan described Parnell as "an honest, straightforward, independent man, possessed of considerable ability and much public spirit; as Chancellor of the Exchequer he was not deficient, and he served his country by his plan to reduce the interest of money. He was amiable in private, mild in disposition, but firm in mind and purpose. His conduct at the Union did him honour, and proved how warmly he was attached to the interests of his country, and on this account he was dismissed".

Family
Parnell married Laetitia Charlotte Brooke, younger daughter of Sir Arthur Brooke, 1st Baronet  and his first wife Margaret Fortescue in 1774, and together they had four children. Their eldest son John Augustus was a deaf-mute who was housed in a large walled garden for most of his life, while their second son Henry Brooke Parnell would go on to inherit the baronetcy and follow his own political career, becoming an Irish peer and also a member of parliament for Queen's County in the House of Commons at Westminster.

Sir John Parnell, 2nd Baronet, left another son William, who in turn had a son, John Henry Parnell. The fourth son of John Henry Parnell was  Charles Stewart Parnell.

References

1744 births
1801 deaths
Irish MPs 1761–1768
Irish MPs 1783–1790
Irish MPs 1790–1797
Irish MPs 1798–1800
Members of the Parliament of the United Kingdom for Queen's County constituencies (1801–1922)
UK MPs 1801–1802
Baronets in the Baronetage of Ireland
Commissioners of the Treasury for Ireland
Chancellors of the Exchequer of Ireland
Members of the Parliament of Ireland (pre-1801) for County Down constituencies
Members of the Parliament of Ireland (pre-1801) for Queen's County constituencies